Madera Canyon is a populated place situated in the Santa Rita Mountains of Santa Cruz County, Arizona, United States. It is located within a canyon of the same name, Madera Canyon, in the Coronado National Forest.

All homes built on U.S. National Forest property were evicted and demolished between 1984 and 1991 for the development of an improved campground.

References

Populated places in Santa Cruz County, Arizona